In Greek mythology, Merope  is one of the seven Pleiades, daughters of Atlas and Pleione. Pleione, their mother, is the daughter of Oceanus and Tethys and is the protector of sailors. Their transformation into the star cluster known as the Pleiades is the subject of various myths.

Mythology

Among the Pleiades
In one story, the Pleiades, along with their half sisters the Hyades, were virgin companions to Artemis. Artemis was the twin of Apollo and daughter of Leto and Zeus, and a protector of both hunters and wild animals. The Pleiades were nymphs, and along with their half sisters, were called Atlantides, Modonodes, or Nysiades and were the caretakers of the infant Bacchus.

Orion pursued the Pleiades named Maia, Electra, Taygete, Celaeno, Alcyone, Sterope, and Merope after he fell in love with their beauty and grace.  Artemis asked Zeus to protect the Pleiades and in turn, Zeus turned them into stars. Artemis was angry because she no longer could see her companions and had her brother, Apollo, send a giant scorpion to chase and kill Orion. Zeus then turned Orion into a constellation to further pursue the Pleiades in the skies.

In another legend, the sisters were transformed by Zeus into stars because Orion fell in love with them and relentlessly pursued their affection for 12 years.  At first they were turned into doves, but later, along with Orion, into stars so that forever the hunter Orion would pursue them.

In either legend the Pleiades were turned into stars and now, along with their half sisters, the Hyades (who died weeping for their dead brother Hyas), are part of the star constellation Taurus.

Marriage
Merope is the faintest of the stars because she was the only of the Pleiades to have married a mortal.  Her sisters had relations with gods and bore them sons, but Merope married Sisyphus and lived on the island Chios. Merope gave birth to Ornytion (Porphyrion), Glaukos, Thersander and Almus. The star Merope is often called the "lost Pleiad" because she was at first not seen by astronomers or charted like her sisters.  One myth says that she hid her face in shame because she had an affair with a mortal man.

In art 
The several 18th and 19th century dramas and operas titled Merope deal with a completely different myth. There have been, however, artistic depictions of the stellar Pleiad:

The Lost Pleiade (1874/75), a marble sculpture by Randolph Rogers, was inspired by  Ovid's Latin poem Fasti, which recounts the legend of the seven sisters. The statue, which shows her rising from a cloud in search of her lost siblings, is on display in the Art Institute of Chicago.

L'etoile perdue (The Lost Star, 1884) by William-Adolphe Bouguereau depicts the separated Merope from behind with her sister Pleiades as faint images in the background (see above). The title has also been rendered as "The Lost Pleiad".

Notes

References 
Calame, Claude. Myth and History in Ancient Greece. 1996. Trans. Daniel W. Berman. New Jersey: Princeton University, 2003.
Ceci, Lynn. "Watchers of the Pleiades: Ethnoastronomy among Native Cultivators in Northeastern North America." Ethnohistory  25.4 (1978): 301–317.
Gould, John. "Law, Custom, and Myth: Aspects of the Social Position of Women in Classical Athens." Myth, Ritual, Memory, and Exchange Essays in Greek Literature and Culture. New York: Oxford University, 2001. 112–157.
Interpretations of Greek Mythology. 1987. Comp. Jan Bremmer. London: Routledge, 1990.
Kellett, E. E. The Story of Myths. New York: Harcourt, Brace, and Company, 1927.
Kershaw, Stephen P. The Greek Myths Gods, Monsters, Heroes, and the Origins of Storytelling. Brief Guide. New York: Carroll and Graf, 2007.
Larson, Jennifer. Greek Nymphs: Myth, Cult, Lore. New York: Oxford University, 2001.
Women's Roles in Ancient Civilizations. Ed. Bella Vivante. Connecticut: Greenwood, 1999.

External links

Pleiades (Greek mythology)
Nymphs
Metamorphoses in Greek mythology
Corinthian characters in Greek mythology
Corinthian mythology